Wandsworth Town is a district of south London, within the London Borough of Wandsworth  southwest of Charing Cross. The area is identified in the London Plan as one of 35 major centres in Greater London.

Toponymy
Wandsworth takes its name from the River Wandle, which enters the Thames at Wandsworth. Wandsworth appears in Domesday Book of 1086 as Wandesorde and Wendelesorde. This means 'enclosure of (a man named) Waendel', whose name is also lent to the River Wandle. To distinguish it from the London Borough of Wandsworth, and historically from the Wandsworth District of the Metropolis and the Metropolitan Borough of Wandsworth, which all covered larger areas, it is also known as Wandsworth Town.

History

At the time of the Domesday Book (1086), the manor of Wandsworth was held partly by William, son of Ansculfy, and partly by St Wandrille's Abbey. It rendered £9. Since at least the early 16th century, Wandsworth has offered accommodation to consecutive waves of immigration, from Protestant Dutch metalworkers fleeing persecution in the 1590s, Huguenots in the 17th century, to recent Eastern European members of the European Union.

Between Wandsworth town centre and the river is the site of Young & Co's Ram Brewery. Shire horse-drawn brewery drays were still used to deliver beer to local pubs. Whilst brewing by Young's stopped in September 2006 when Young & Co merged its operations with Charles Wells of Bedford, brewing does continue on the site by a master brewer albeit in small amounts. A planning application to redevelop the site for residential and shopping/leisure "mixed use" was submitted in 2012 and approved in 2013. In 2019 it was announced that Sambrook's Brewery will continue to brew beer on the site moving from their brewhouse on York Road in 2020 with John Hatch (former master brewer of Youngs Brewery) taking an active role in tours.

Wandsworth gas plant was built in 1834 against the River Thames near Wandsworth Bridge. The undertaking became the Wandsworth and Putney Gaslight and Coke Company in 1854 and was incorporated by Act of Parliament in 1856. Coal for making coal gas was brought by sea from North East England and unloaded on the Thames beside the gasworks. The firm grew by a series of mergers and takeovers so that by 1936 it served a considerable area of south-west London. The company's name evolved each time it merged with or took over neighbouring gas companies, but from 1936 it was the Wandsworth and District Gas Company. The company was nationalised in 1949 and became part of the South Eastern Gas Board.

Wandsworth power station was built on The Causeway and supplied electricity to the district of Wandsworth from 1897 to 1964. It was owned and operated by the County of London Electric Supply Company Limited until the nationalisation of the British electricity supply industry in 1948. The power station was decommissioned in 1964. There is an operational 132 kV national grid substation to the east of the River Wandle.

Geography
The former wharf area of the river-front is now lined with new apartment blocks, with several bars and restaurants. Notable pubs include the Ship Inn and the Waterfront, on the western and eastern side of (the southern bridgehead of) Wandsworth Bridge respectively.

Wandsworth Common is set back from the river, at the top of East Hill, and is adjoined by an area known locally as "the Toast Rack" that has some of the most expensive townhouses in London, as well as the restaurant Chez Bruce, formerly Harveys, where chef Gordon Ramsay learned his trade, and for which co-owner Bruce Poole gained a Michelin star in 1999. Also in the area is the Royal Victoria Patriotic Building, which now contains flats, a theatre school and a restaurant.

The Tonsleys/Old York Road is a residential area of old Wandsworth close to the river and town centre, so called because many of the street names have the word "Tonsley" included. It has a village feel with the Old York Road's cafes and shops at its heart. The area has three notable pubs: the Royal Standard, the East Hill and the Alma. East Hill is an area of large Victorian houses bordered by the west side of Wandsworth Common. From 2007 to 2014 the area was used as the location for the BBC TV series Outnumbered.

Wandsworth High Street is dominated by the regenerated Southside shopping centre, cinema and restaurant complex (formerly called the Arndale Centre). Behind the shopping centre, and following the River Wandle upstream towards Earlsfield and further south to Wimbledon, is King George's Park.

Wandsworth Museum previously occupied the former Victorian library in West Hill having been moved there in 2007. The museum closed in March 2015.  The De Morgan Centre is currently situated in Wandsworth Museum and houses a collection of Victorian artwork. A green plaque to commemorate aviation pioneer Alliott Verdon Roe was unveiled by Wandsworth Council and members of the Verdon-Roe family beside the A3 close to Wandsworth Fire Station on the site of Roe's first workshop in the stables of his brother's house at 47 West Hill.

The underpass beneath the Wandsworth Bridge roundabout was the location for the scene in Stanley Kubrick's A Clockwork Orange in which a tramp is attacked.

There are several schools in Wandsworth including Shaftesbury Park Primary School.

Wandsworth Town Library is on Garratt Lane. The library opened in 2009 and is located in the former court house, a listed building.

Transport
The nearest railway stations are Wandsworth Town; Wandsworth Common (one stop from Clapham Junction, and 12 minutes' train ride from London Victoria); and Earlsfield, (one stop from Clapham Junction, and 12 minutes' train ride from London Waterloo). Wandsworth Town is also served by Southfields tube station in the Southfields area of the Town.

Churches
All Saints' is the original parish church of Wandsworth, dating back to the 13th century, although the present building is mostly of the 18th century. St Anne's and Holy Trinity churches were built in the 19th century to accommodate a growing population.

Wandsworth Prison
Built in 1851, Wandsworth Prison is a Category B men's prison. It is the largest prison in London and one of the largest in Europe, with a similar capacity to Liverpool Prison.

See also
List of people from Wandsworth
List of schools in Wandsworth

References

Further reading

External links

Areas of London
Districts of the London Borough of Wandsworth
Districts of London on the River Thames
Major centres of London